Bulgnéville is a commune in the Vosges department in Grand Est in northeastern France.

History
The Battle of Bulgnéville took place there on 2 July 1431.

A major employer is the cheese factory of the Hermitage, which makes Le Brouère.

See also
Communes of the Vosges department

References

External links

Official site

Communes of Vosges (department)
Vosges communes articles needing translation from French Wikipedia